WRTZ (1410 kHz) is a commercial AM radio station licensed to Roanoke, Virginia.  WRTZ is owned and operated by Metromark Media, LLC.  It broadcasts an oldies and classic hits radio format supplied by The True Oldies Channel.  It plays the hits of the 1960s, 70s and 80s, hosted by Scott Shannon and other disc jockeys.

By day, WRTZ is powered at 5,000 watts non-directional.  But to protect other stations on 1410 AM from interference, at night it greatly reduces power to 72 watts.  The transmitter is on Luckett Street NW in Roanoke.

History
The call sign was WRIS. It was originally a daytimer station, required to go off the air at night. In the 1970s, it was a full service, middle of the road station, broadcasting popular adult music, news and sports. It was a network affiliate of the Mutual Broadcasting System.

References

External links
True Oldies WRTZ Online

RTZ
Radio stations established in 1953
Classic hits radio stations in the United States
Oldies radio stations in the United States